W. Sydney Robinson (born 16 April 1986) is a British biographer and book reviewer. He was educated at Harrow School, the University of Manchester and the University of Cambridge, where he was a Research Associate between 2013 and 2015.

Biographer
He is best known as the authorized biographer of the Academy Award-winning screenplay writer and dramatist Sir Ronald Harwood. The book, Speak Well of Me: the authorized biography of Ronald Harwood was published by Oberon Books in May 2017 and charts Harwood's life from his impoverished childhood as part of a large Jewish family in South Africa to his years of success in the West End and Hollywood. Reviewing the book in The Times of London, theatre critic Benedict Nightingale described it as 'engaging' and 'entertaining'. The reviewer in the Jewish Chronicle, however, described it as 'wincingly florid' and 'egregious'.

Published works
Robinson has also published biographies of the Victorian investigative journalist W. T. Stead, Muckraker: the scandalous life and times of Britain's first investigative journalist, and a group biography of Sir William Joynson-Hicks, Dean Inge, Lord Reith and Sir Arthur Bryant, The Last Victorians: a daring reassessment of four twentieth century eccentrics. Muckraker was awarded the Political Biography of the Year Award at the 2013 Total Politics and Paddy Power Political Book Awards and was included in the 'Books of 2012' selection in The Sunday Times. In a review of The Last Victorians in The Spectator, biographer and historian Philip Ziegler commented that 'Robinson has real talent'.

Robinson has reviewed books in The Sunday Times, the TLS, the Spectator and the Literary Review.

Life
He lives in Northamptonshire and teaches full-time at Oundle.

References

External links
How I Write by W. Sydney Robinson
No Regrets: A Biographer's Celebration
Ann Widdecombe presents W. Sydney Robinson with Political Biography of the Year Award

1986 births
Living people
Teachers of Oundle School
People educated at Harrow School
British biographers